Events from the year 1877 in Russia.

Incumbents
 Monarch – Alexander II

Events

 
 
  
  
 3rd Army Corps (Russian Empire)
  Russo-Turkish War (1877–78)
 Budapest Convention of 1877
 Provisional Russian Administration in Bulgaria

Births
4 March - Alexander Fyodorovich Gedike, composer (d. 1957)
14 August - Iosif Dubrovinsky, Boshevik revolutionary (d. 1913)

Deaths

References

1877 in Russia
Years of the 19th century in the Russian Empire